"Sorry, I'm a Lady" is a song co-written by Rolf Soja and Frank Dostal, and performed by Spanish duo Baccara. It was released in 1977 as the second single from their debut album, Baccara (1977). The song was a number one hit in Austria, Belgium, the Netherlands, Norway and West Germany.

Charts

Weekly charts

Year-end charts

Other uses 

 The duo Frecuencia Mod did a cover of the song in Spanish with the name "Yo Soy Una Dama" in the year 1978.
 The song appears in the soundtrack of the 1978 British movie The Stud.
 The song appears in the soundtrack of the 2010 Italian movie Loose Cannons.

References

1977 singles
Number-one singles in Austria
Number-one singles in Germany
Number-one singles in Norway
Dutch Top 40 number-one singles
European Hot 100 Singles number-one singles
Songs written by Frank Dostal
1977 songs
RCA Records singles